Luke Jonathan Rowe (born 16 September 1991) is a New Zealand footballer who plays in England for the  side Bedworth United, where he plays as a defender.

Playing career

Wellington Phoenix
In June 2012 Rowe was named as one of eight inaugural players to join the Wellington Phoenix academy dubbed the 'Football School of Excellence'. Due to seven Phoenix players being away on international duty Rowe and fellow FSE player Tom Biss where called on to make their debuts in a round 2 away fixture against Melbourne Heart. Despite four players making their debut the Phoenix managed come away with a 1–1 draw. Rowe played a full 90 minutes at left back.

Eastwood Town
Luke Rowe joined Northern Premier League Division One South side Eastwood Town in October 2013, he only went on to make four appearances for the club (two league appearances), before departing in December 2013.

International career
Rowe represented New Zealand at the 2011 FIFA U-20 World Cup in Colombia.

In mid-2012 Rowe was named as one of four players on standby for the New Zealand Olympic Football team competing at the London Olympics.

International goals and caps
New Zealand's goal tally first.

References

External links

Living people
1991 births
Association football defenders
English footballers
New Zealand association footballers
New Zealand international footballers
A-League Men players
Birmingham City F.C. players
Team Wellington players
Wellington Phoenix FC players
Hinckley United F.C. players
Eastwood Town F.C. players
Bedworth United F.C. players
Southern Football League players